Anas Beshr (born 19 July 1993) is an Egyptian sprinter specializing in the 400 meters.

2013 season
Beshr won silver at the 2013 Mediterranean Games in the 400 meters.

2014 season
He set a national record in 2014 (later broken).

2015 season
In 2015 he won silver at the 2015 Arab Athletics Championships.

2016 season
In 2016, at a meet in Montverde, Florida, Beshr reached the Olympic qualifying standard in the 400 meters setting a new national record. He competed at the 2016 Summer Olympics.

References

External links

1993 births
Living people
Egyptian male sprinters
Place of birth missing (living people)
Athletes (track and field) at the 2016 Summer Olympics
Olympic athletes of Egypt
Mediterranean Games silver medalists for Egypt
Mediterranean Games medalists in athletics
Athletes (track and field) at the 2013 Mediterranean Games